Disturbed is a 1990 American horror film directed by Charles Winkler starring Malcolm McDowell as a psychiatrist who rapes a young woman in his care, then must deal with her vengeance-seeking daughter 10 years later.

Plot
Dr. Derrick Russell (Malcolm McDowell) rapes one of the patients in his care. When the patient throws herself from the roof shortly afterward, he describes her suicide as a consequence of her depression. Ten years later, he plans to rape another patient, Sandy Ramirez (Pamela Gidley). What Russell does not know is that Sandy is the daughter of his previous victim, and she is bent on revenge. A post-credit sequence depicts a man kissing the camera before he laughs.

Cast
 Malcolm McDowell as Dr. Derrick Russell
 Geoffrey Lewis as Michael Kahn
 Priscilla Pointer as Nurse Francine
 Pamela Gidley as Sandy Ramirez
 Irwin Keyes as Pat Tuel
 Clint Howard as Brian
 Kim McGuire as Selina

External links
 
 
 

1990 films
1990 horror films
1990s horror thriller films
American horror thriller films
American independent films
American erotic thriller films
American rape and revenge films
Films set in psychiatric hospitals
1990s English-language films
Films directed by Charles Winkler
1990s American films